"Just Another Day in Paradise" is a song co-written and recorded by American country music singer Phil Vassar that reached the top of the Billboard Hot Country Singles & Tracks chart, becoming Vassar's first Number One as an artist. It was released in June 2000 as the second single from his self-titled debut album.  It also peaked at #35 on the Billboard Hot 100 making it a minor crossover hit and is Vassar's highest peaking song on the chart.  The song was written by Vassar and Craig Wiseman.

Content
The song tells the story of a couple raising a family, and dealing with all the mundane domestic distractions, from sour milk and a broken washing machine to a stack of bills.

Critical reception
Deborah Evans Price, of Billboard magazine, reviewed the song favorably, calling it "a celebration of the joys and challenges of the American family." She goes on to say that Vassar has a "strong, warm voice, and he does so much more than simply sing a song. He injects it with personality and emotion - and he truly brings it to life".

Music video
The music video was directed by Gerry Wenner, and premiered on CMT on June 29, 2000, during "The CMT Delivery Room". The video shows Vassar filming their family on a camcorder at a house, such as a closeup shot of the eggs, a shot of burnt toast, as well as the mother preparing breakfast for the kids, looking at sour milk, sitting on a broken washing machine, having pizza by candlelight, and the family preparing for bed. Throughout the video, Vassar sings and plays piano on a beach, and singing in a living room, and on the same beach, along with their family spending time on the same beach. At the end of the video, the house is revealed to be a film set on the beach and looks just like a toy, and Vassar is sitting in the kitchen.

Chart positions
"Just Another Day in Paradise" debuted at number 65 on the U.S. Billboard Hot Country Singles & Tracks for the week of June 10, 2000.

Year-end charts

Notes

Parodies
This song was parodied by country parodist Cledus T. Judd on his album Cledus Envy under the title "Just Another Day in Parodies". Vassar makes a spoken cameo at the end of Judd's parody.

References

2000 singles
2000 songs
Phil Vassar songs
Songs written by Phil Vassar
Songs written by Craig Wiseman
Arista Nashville singles
Song recordings produced by Byron Gallimore